Agnes Maxwell MacLeod (1783–1879) also known as Mrs. Norman MacLeod was a Scottish poet. She is best known as the author of the ballad Sound the Pibroch.

Life
Agnes Maxwell was born on the Isle of Mull, in the Inner Hebrides. In her early youth, she lived with an uncle and aunt in Drumdrissaig, on the western coast of Knapdale. When of age, she went to an Edinburgh finishing school, then returned to Mull. She met Rev. Norman MacLeod, a Church of Scotland minister and married him four years later. She spent the next nearly-sixty years as a minister's wife in Campbeltown, Campsie, and at St Columba Church in Glasgow. She was the wife of a poet and the mother of poets, and a poet herself. She would go on to write and compile a poetry collection called Songs of the North, that would be edited by her granddaughter Annie Campbell MacLeod Wilson, Harold Boulton, and Malcolm Lawson, and which was dedicated to Queen Victoria. One of the songs it contains is Sound the Pibroch, which is about the Jacobite Uprising of 1745, and which has since been recorded by The Corries and many other Scottish folk music bands.

References

1783 births
1879 deaths
19th-century Scottish poets
19th-century Scottish women writers
Calvinist and Reformed poets
People from the Isle of Mull
Scottish women poets
Jacobite poets